Adel Abdulrahman Al Asoomi (born January 1, 1969) is a Bahraini businessman and politician. A member of the Council of Representatives, the lower house of Parliament in Bahrain, since 2006, he succeeded Mishaal Al-Salami as Speaker of the Arab Parliament in October 2020.

Career
Al Asoomi was born in Manama. He earned a high school diploma in 1987.

Al Asoomi served as Chairman of the Finance Committee of the Bahrain Volleyball Association (BVA) as well as Chairman of the Commercial and Financial Investment Committee at Busaiteen Club in 1996 and 2006. He was also Vice-President of the Supreme Organizing Committee at the Club and its President for a time. In 2000, he worked as an auditor at the Asian Volleyball Confederation. Since 2005, he has chaired the Bahrain Mind and Electronic Sports Federation. Other posts he has held include President of the West Asian Chess Federation.

In the 2002 Bahraini general election, he lost the runoff for the First District of the Capital Governorate with 373 votes for 43.83%, defeated by Saadi Muhammad of the Al-Menber Islamic Society. However, Al Asoomi won their rematch in the 2006 Bahraini general election with 2,383 votes for 68.62%, a 1,293-vote margin. In the 2010 Bahraini general election, he won with 1,878 votes for 65.30%, followed by a 2014 Bahraini general election runoff win with 2,265 votes for 54.50%, a 374-vote margin over Al-Menber’s candidate Khalid Sulaibikh.

References	

Members of the Council of Representatives (Bahrain)
Bahraini businesspeople
People from Manama
1969 births
Living people